The RIBA President's Medals are international awards presented annually by the Royal Institute of British Architects (RIBA) to architecture students or recent graduates. In 2019, the RIBA invited 408 schools of architecture located in 80 countries to nominate up to two entries for the Bronze Medal, up to two entries for the Silver Medal, and one entry for the Dissertation Medal.

History
The RIBA President's Medals have been awarded annually since 1836, the year when George Godwin was awarded the Honorary Silver Medal for his essay 'Nature and Properties of Concrete, and its Application to Construction up to the Current Period'. Medals are awarded in three categories: the Bronze Medal for best design project at RIBA Part 1 or equivalent; the Silver Medal for best design project at RIBA Part 2 or equivalent; and the Dissertation Medal (written during either Part 1 or Part 2). The judges also award up to three commendations in each category, and the Serjeant Awards for Excellence in Drawing.

As the RIBA's oldest awards (preceding the Royal Gold Medal, formally established in 1848), the RIBA President's Medals embody the RIBA's commitment to architecture and the education of individuals into understanding architecture's wider social benefits.

Judging
An international jury of architects, designers and artists select the winners from entries submitted by schools of architecture worldwide. Former judges include Cedric Price, David Adjaye, David Chipperfield, Denys Lasdun, Daniel Libeskind, Ian Ritchie, Michael Hopkins, Simon Hudspith, Eva Jiricna, Will Alsop, Bob Allies, Kazuyo Sejima, Patrick Schumacher, Ken Shuttleworth, Benedetta Tagliabue, Ian Davidson, Bruce McLean, Odile Decq, Lella Vignelli, Farshid Moussavi, Nanako Umemoto, Nathalie de Vries, Eric Parry, Vicky Richardson, Ellen Van Loon, Catherine Slessor, Harriet Harriss, and Julia B. Bolles-Wilson.

Ceremony
The winners receive their awards from the RIBA President at a ceremony held at the RIBA in early December of each year. Guest speakers have included Norman Foster, Richard Rogers, Mark Lawson, Richard MacCormac, Paul Smith, Martha Schwartz, and Alex James.

Exhibition
An exhibition of winning work and selected entries is exhibited at the RIBA HQ in London for two months before touring throughout the UK and internationally. Over the last few years, and after closing in London, the President's Medals exhibition has been displayed in the UK (Belfast, Bournemouth, Canterbury, Cardiff, Edinburgh, Glasgow, Leicester, Liverpool, Newcastle, and Plymouth) and also travelled internationally to Australia, Bulgaria, Chile, China, Cyprus, Egypt, Finland, France, Hong Kong, Kuwait, India, Ireland, Lebanon, Malaysia, Oman, Romania, Saudi Arabia, Serbia, Singapore, South Africa, Sri Lanka, Turkey, and the United Arab Emirates. The touring of the exhibition is made possible by the generosity of art galleries and schools of architecture that partner with the RIBA to display the exhibition.

Winners
Silver Medal:

Bronze Medal:

Dissertation Medal:

References

External links
 President's Medals site

Architecture awards
Awards established in 1984
British awards
Royal Institute of British Architects